Hibiscus hispidissimus is a species of Hibiscus found in South East Asia.

References

External links
 
 

hispidissimus
Plants described in 1854